Edward Burson Spalding (February 2, 1840 – March 4, 1920) was a Union Army soldier in the American Civil War and a recipient of the United States military's highest decoration, the Medal of Honor, for his actions at the Battle of Shiloh.

Biography
Born on February 2, 1840, in Byron, Illinois, Spalding joined the 52nd Illinois Infantry from Rockford in October 1861, and was mustered out December 1864. By April 6, 1862, he was serving as a sergeant in Company E of the 52nd Illinois Volunteer Infantry Regiment. On that day, at Pittsburg Landing, Tennessee, during the Battle of Shiloh, he was severely wounded but continued to fight for the remainder of the battle. For this action, he was awarded the Medal of Honor several decades later, on January 15, 1894.

Spalding's official Medal of Honor citation reads:
Although twice wounded, and thereby crippled for life, he remained fighting in open ground to the close of the battle.

Spalding died on March 4, 1920, at age 80 and was buried at Floyd Cemetery in Sioux City, Iowa.

See also

List of Medal of Honor recipients

References

External links

1840 births
1920 deaths
People from Byron, Illinois
People of Illinois in the American Civil War
Union Army soldiers
United States Army Medal of Honor recipients
Burials in Iowa
American Civil War recipients of the Medal of Honor